Al-Quadin Muhammad (born March 28, 1995) is an American football defensive end who is currently a free agent. He played college football at Miami. He was drafted by the New Orleans Saints in the sixth round of the 2017 NFL Draft.

High school career
A native of Irvington, New Jersey, After transferring from Paterson Catholic High School which closed after his freshman year, Muhammad was a standout at Don Bosco Preparatory High School, where he was a four-star defensive end, ranked as the No. 1 prospect in New Jersey.

College career
Muhammad committed to Miami in 2013. As a freshman he played in five games, making 6 tackles and 2.0 sacks. Muhammad was handed a season-long suspension for an altercation involving a former roommate after Miami's spring game; he missed the entire 2014 season. In 2015, he played in 12 games and finished the season with 54 tackles, 8.5 for loss and 5.0 sacks. But Muhammad would miss out the 2016 season after he was suspended and later dismissed from the football program along with teammate Jermaine Grace for his role in a luxury rental car scandal that violated NCAA rules.

Professional career

New Orleans Saints
Muhammad was drafted by the New Orleans Saints in the sixth round, 196th overall, in the 2017 NFL Draft. He debuted for the Saints in Week 1 of the 2017 NFL season against the Minnesota Vikings.

On September 1, 2018, Muhammad was waived by the Saints.

Indianapolis Colts
On September 2, 2018, Muhammad was claimed off waivers by the Indianapolis Colts. He was waived by the Colts on October 4, 2018, and was re-signed to the practice squad. He was promoted to the active roster on October 13, 2018.

In Week 10 of the 2020 season against the Tennessee Titans on Thursday Night Football, Muhammad was ejected from the game after punching offensive tackle Ty Sambrailo.

Muhammad re-signed with the Colts on April 1, 2021.

Chicago Bears
On March 20, 2022, Muhammad signed a two-year contract with the Chicago Bears.

He was released on February 21, 2023.

References

1995 births
Living people
African-American Muslims
Sportspeople from Essex County, New Jersey
Don Bosco Preparatory High School alumni
Paterson Catholic High School alumni
People from Irvington, New Jersey
Players of American football from New Jersey
American football defensive ends
Miami Hurricanes football players
New Orleans Saints players
Indianapolis Colts players
Chicago Bears players